Papakōwhai is a suburb of Porirua City.

The name "Papakōwhai" in the Māori language  means "yellow earth". As well as being the name of the suburb it is the name of the main road connecting the suburb to the south. Most of the other streets in Papakōwhai take their names from Scottish rivers.

The first European known to have settled in the area was William Bowler in the early 19th century. 

 Papakōwhai includes the Royal New Zealand Police College and Aotea Lagoon public park.

Demographics

Papakōwhai had a population of 2,268 at the 2018 New Zealand census, a decrease of 12 people (-0.5%) since the 2013 census, and a decrease of 36 people (-1.6%) since the 2006 census. There were 759 households. There were 1,086 males and 1,185 females, giving a sex ratio of 0.92 males per female. The median age was 42.9 years (compared with 37.4 years nationally), with 411 people (18.1%) aged under 15 years, 393 (17.3%) aged 15 to 29, 1,077 (47.5%) aged 30 to 64, and 390 (17.2%) aged 65 or older.

Ethnicities were 83.6% European/Pākehā, 13.6% Māori, 6.9% Pacific peoples, 8.7% Asian, and 1.5% other ethnicities (totals add to more than 100% since people could identify with multiple ethnicities).

The proportion of people born overseas was 21.6%, compared with 27.1% nationally.

Although some people objected to giving their religion, 49.2% had no religion, 39.2% were Christian, 1.7% were Hindu, 1.2% were Muslim, 0.4% were Buddhist and 2.0% had other religions.

Of those at least 15 years old, 531 (28.6%) people had a bachelor or higher degree, and 210 (11.3%) people had no formal qualifications. The median income was $43,400, compared with $31,800 nationally. The employment status of those at least 15 was that 1,026 (55.3%) people were employed full-time, 282 (15.2%) were part-time, and 57 (3.1%) were unemployed.

Education

References

External links 
 Papakowhai School

Suburbs of Porirua